Zero Halliburton, stylized as ZERO  Halliburton, is a company that manufactures hard-wearing travel cases and briefcases, mainly of aluminum.  On December 29, 2006, Zero Corporation sold its consumer division to ACE Co., Ltd., a Japanese luggage manufacturer. Today, Zero Halliburton is a wholly owned subsidiary of ACE Co., Ltd., of Osaka and Tokyo.

Erle P. Halliburton, the American founder of Halliburton, had commissioned the aluminum case in 1938 from aircraft engineers because other luggage could not endure the rough travel through Texas oil fields. In addition to being more durable than a leather or cloth case due to its rigidity, the aluminium case seals tightly against dust and water.

The aluminum cases have appeared in over 200 Hollywood movies and television shows, often as a MacGuffin. In addition to aluminum, Zero Halliburton cases have been available in carbon fiber, polycarbonate, polypropylene, and Texalium (an aluminum-coated fiberglass). Famously, the nuclear football, the briefcase which the President of the United States can use to order a nuclear strike, is a modified Zero Halliburton case, although enclosed in a black leather 'jacket' to make it appear less militaristic in diplomatic situations.

References

External links 
Company history at Zero Halliburton Web site
Zero Halliburton Shop

Luggage manufacturers